Daivanamathil is a 2005 Indian Malayalam-language film directed by Jayaraj and written and produced by Aryadan Shoukath. The film is based on the Demolition of the Babri Masjid in December 1992, which had its repercussions on Muslims in Kerala. It features Prithviraj Sukumaran and Bhavana in the lead roles.

Daivanamathil was released on 3 June 2005, the film received the Nargis Dutt Award for Best Feature Film on National Integration and Kerala State Film Award for Second Best Actress for Bhavana.

Plot
The story is about Anwar (Pritviraj) who discontinues his education further at the Aligarh Muslim University soon after his marriage. During his stay the Babri Masjid demolition occurs and as a result he turns a fundamentalist. His wife an educated Muslim girl (Bhavana) tries to alter and change the ideals of her Islamist fanatic husband. But to reform himself he rather chooses the way to jail and starts afresh. The thread of the story is the aftermath of the Babri Masjid demolition and the Gujarat riots.

Anwar encounters a group of Karsevaks in a train, all of them headed towards the demolition of Babri Masjid. The encounter greatly disturbs him and he is no longer the same loving and romantic husband to his wife as well as the engrossed PG student.

He writes a letter to Samira about his intentions and his decision to join Jehad to seek revenge on others. Anwar goes on to become a full-time extremist and plants a bomb in a hotel at the Ramzan time. This hurts his grandfather a lot who is always against extremism.

Anwar on the other hand is unstoppable and believes that the deaths of innocents are a part of the Jehad. Sahib tells his grandson to stop all his activities at once and warns him about the ugly consequences, the community has to face, because of his deeds, but to no avail.

Meanwhile, Anwar lands up in jail. Samira only has one wish, her husband should come back to his normal life. He should become her old Anwar, romantic and soft person.

Cast
 Prithviraj as Anwar
 Bhavana as Sameera
 Zeenath
 Nilambur Ayisha

Awards
National Film Awards
 Nargis Dutt Award for Best Feature Film on National Integration
Kerala State Film Awards
 Kerala State Film Award for Second Best Actress - Bhavana, 2005.

Asianet Film Awards
 Asianet Film Award for Best Supporting Actress for Bhavana in 2005.

References

External links
 

2000s Malayalam-language films
Films about terrorism in India
Best Film on National Integration National Film Award winners